Eileen Ramsay may refer to

 Eileen Ramsay (author) (1940–2023), British author
 Eileen Ramsay (photographer) (1915–2017), British photographer